Thea Engelbertinki is a Dutch Paralympian.

She competed at the 1976 Summer Paralympics, winning a gold medal in shot put, and javelin.

See also
Paralympic sports
Sport in the Netherlands

References

Living people
Dutch athletes
Year of birth missing (living people)
Place of birth missing (living people)
20th-century Dutch women